Apaidia mesogona is a moth of the family Erebidae first described by Jean Baptiste Godart in 1824. It is found in Western Europe, Sardinia, Corsica and North Africa.

The larvae feed on Quercus suber, Thymus, Buxus sempervirens and Lavandula species.

References

External links

Lepiforum e.V.

Moths described in 1824
Lithosiina
Moths of Europe
Moths of Africa